The Erdős–Straus conjecture is an unproven statement in number theory.
In other words, the number  can be written as a sum of three positive unit fractions.

The conjecture is named after Paul Erdős and Ernst G. Straus, who formulated it in 1948, but it is connected to much more ancient mathematics; sums of unit fractions, like the one in this problem, are known as Egyptian fractions, because of their use in ancient Egyptian mathematics. The Erdős–Straus conjecture is one of many conjectures by Erdős, and one of many unsolved problems in mathematics concerning Diophantine equations.

Additionally, these searches need only consider values of  that are prime numbers, because any composite counterexample would have a smaller counterexample among its prime factors.

If the conjecture is reframed to allow negative unit fractions, then it is known to be true. Generalizations of the conjecture to fractions with numerator 5 or larger have also been studied.

Background and history
When a rational number is expanded into a sum of unit fractions, the expansion is called an Egyptian fraction. This way of writing fractions dates to the mathematics of ancient Egypt, in which fractions were written this way instead of in the more modern vulgar fraction form  with a numerator  and denominator . The Egyptians produced tables of Egyptian fractions for unit fractions multiplied by two, the numbers that in modern notation would be written , such as the Rhind Mathematical Papyrus table; in these tables, most of these expansions use either two or three terms. These tables were needed, because the obvious expansion  was not allowed: the Egyptians required all of the fractions in an Egyptian fraction to be different from each other. This same requirement, that all fractions be different, is sometimes imposed in the Erdős–Straus conjecture, but it makes no significant difference to the problem, because for  any solution to  where the unit fractions are not distinct can be converted into a solution where they are all distinct; see below.

Although the Egyptians did not always find expansions using as few terms as possible, later mathematicians have been interested in the question of how few terms are needed. Every fraction  has an expansion of at most  terms, so in particular  needs at most two terms,  needs at most three terms, and  needs at most four terms. Thus, the conjecture covers the first unknown case of a more general question, the problem of finding for all  the maximum number of terms needed in expansions for fractions .

One way to find short (but not always shortest) expansions uses the greedy algorithm for Egyptian fractions, first described in 1202 by Fibonacci in his book Liber Abaci. This method chooses one unit fraction at a time, at each step choosing the largest possible unit fraction that would not cause the expanded sum to exceed the target number. After each step, the numerator of the fraction that still remains to be expanded decreases, so the total number of steps can never exceed the starting numerator, but sometimes it is smaller. For numbers of the form , the greedy algorithm will produce a four-term expansion whenever  is 1 modulo 4, and an expansion with fewer terms otherwise. Thus, another way of rephrasing the Erdős–Straus conjecture asks whether there exists another method for producing Egyptian fractions, using a smaller maximum number of terms for the numbers . 

Richard Obláth also published an early work on the conjecture, a paper written in 1948 and published in 1950, in which he extended earlier calculations of Straus and Harold N. Shapiro in order to verify the conjecture for all .

Formulation

Multiplying both sides of the equation   by  leads to an equivalent polynomial form  for the problem.

Distinct unit fractions
For , it does not matter whether they are required to be distinct: if there exists a solution with any three integers, then there exists a solution with distinct integers. This is because two identical unit fractions can be replaced through one of the following two expansions:

(according to whether the repeated fraction has an even or odd denominator) and this replacement can be repeated until no duplicate fractions remain.

Negative-number solutions
This requirement is essential to the difficulty of the problem.

Computational results
If the conjecture is false, it could be proven false simply by finding a number  that has no three-term representation. In order to check this, various authors have performed brute-force searches for counterexamples to the conjecture.

In such searches, it is only necessary to look for expansions for numbers  where  is a prime number. This is because, whenever  has a three-term expansion, so does  for all positive integers .

If  were a counterexample to the conjecture, for a composite number , every prime factor  of  would also provide a counterexample  that would have been found earlier by the brute-force search. Therefore, checking the existence of a solution for composite numbers is redundant, and can be skipped by the search. Additionally, the known modular identities for the conjecture (see below) can speed these searches by skipping over other values known to have a solution. For instance, the greedy algorithm finds an expansion with three or fewer terms for every number  where  is not 1 modulo 4, so the searches only need to test values that are 1 modulo 4. One way to make progress on this problem is to collect more modular identities, allowing computer searches to reach higher limits with fewer tests.

Theoretical results
In the form , a polynomial equation with integer variables, the Erdős–Straus conjecture is an example of a Diophantine equation. The Hasse principle for Diophantine equations suggests that these equations should be studied using modular arithmetic. If an polynomial equation has a solution in the integers, then taking this solution modulo , for any integer , provides a solution in modulo- arithmetic. In the other direction, if an equation has a solution modulo  for every prime power , then in some cases it is possible to piece together these modular solutions, using methods related to the Chinese remainder theorem, to get a solution in the integers. The power of the Hasse principle to solve some problems is limited by the Manin obstruction, but for the Erdős–Straus conjecture this obstruction does not exist.

On the face of it this principle makes little sense for the Erdős–Straus conjecture. For every , the equation  is easily solvable modulo any prime, or prime power, but there appears to be no way to piece those solutions together to get a positive integer solution to the equation. Nevertheless, modular arithmetic, and identities based on modular arithmetic, have proven a very important tool in the study of the conjecture.

Modular identities
For values of  satisfying certain congruence relations, one can find an expansion for  automatically as an instance of a polynomial identity. For instance, whenever  is 2 modulo 3,  has the expansion

Polynomial identities listed by  provide three-term Egyptian fractions for  whenever  is one of:
2 mod 3 (above),
3 mod 4,
2 or 3 mod 5,
3, 5, or 6 mod 7, or
5 mod 8.
Combinations of Mordell's identities can be used to expand  for all  except possibly those that are 1, 121, 169, 289, 361, or 529 mod 840. The smallest prime that these identities do not cover is 1009. By combining larger classes of modular identities, Webb and others showed that the natural density of potential counterexamples to the conjecture is zero: as a parameter  goes to infinity, the fraction of values in the interval . that could be counterexamples tends to zero in the limit.

Nonexistence of identities
If it were possible to find solutions such as the ones above for enough different moduli, forming a complete covering system of congruences, the problem would be solved. However, as  showed, a polynomial identity that provides a solution for values of  congruent to  mod  can exist only when  is not congruent to a square modulo . (More formally, this kind of identity can exist only when  is not a quadratic residue modulo .) For instance, 2 is a non-square mod 3, so Mordell's result allows the existence of an identity for  congruent to 2 mod 3. However, 1 is a square mod 3 (equal to the square of both 1 and 2 mod 3), so there can be no similar identity for all values of  that are congruent to 1 mod 3. More generally, as 1 is a square mod  for all , there can be no complete covering system of modular identities for all , because 1 will always be uncovered.

Despite Mordell's result limiting the form of modular identities for this problem, there is still some hope of using modular identities to prove the Erdős–Straus conjecture. No prime number can be a square, so by the Hasse–Minkowski theorem, whenever  is prime, there exists a larger prime  such that  is not a quadratic residue modulo . One possible approach to proving the conjecture would be
to find for each prime  a larger prime  and a congruence solving the  problem for  congruent to  mod . If this could be done, no prime  could be a counterexample to the conjecture and the conjecture would be true.

The number of solutions
For some other Diophantine problems, the existence of a solution can be demonstrated through asymptotic lower bounds on the number of solutions, but this works best when the number of solutions grows at least polynomially, so the slower growth rate of Elsholtz and Tao's result makes a proof of this type less likely. For instance, setting  gives one of Mordell's identities, valid when  is 3 mod 4.

Generalizations
As with fractions of the form , it has been conjectured that every fraction  (for ) can be expressed as a sum of three positive unit fractions. A generalized version of the conjecture states that, for any positive , all but finitely many fractions  can be expressed as a sum of three positive unit fractions. The conjecture for fractions  was made by Wacław Sierpiński in a 1956 paper, which went on to credit the full conjecture to Sierpiński's student Andrzej Schinzel.

In particular, if the Erdős–Straus conjecture itself (the case ) is false, then the number of counterexamples grows only sublinearly. Even more strongly, for any fixed , only a sublinear number of values of  need more than two terms in their Egyptian fraction expansions. The generalized version of the conjecture is equivalent to the statement that the number of unexpandable fractions is not just sublinear but bounded.

See also
List of sums of reciprocals

Notes

References

.
.
.
.
.
. See in particular the "Small numerators" section
.

.
.
.
.
.
.
.
.
.
.
.
.

.
.
.
.
.

.
.
.

Conjectures
Unsolved problems in number theory
Egyptian fractions
Diophantine equations
Straus conjecture